Thomas Jakl is the former chair of the European Chemicals Agency's (European Chemicals Agency, ECHA) Management board and is Deputy Director General of the Austrian Environment Ministry responsible for Chemicals Policy. His field of activity includes legislation on chemical substances at the national, European and UN levels. He served as ECHA's president from 2008 until September 2012. He is president of the Governing Board of PARC - the "Partnership for Risk Assessment for Chemicals" a 400 Million Euro initiative of the EU's research program "Horizon Europe".

Education
	1991 - PhD in plant physiology with specialization in photosynthesis research and simulation of plant bio-productivity at the University of Vienna.
	M.Sc. in Earth Sciences.
       2017 graduated according to ISO 17024 "Certified Supervisory Expert, CSE"

Tenure at Austria's Environment Ministry
Dr. Thomas Jakl has worked in different high level policy positions, including the Head of EU-Presidency delegation for international negotiations (UN) in the field of chemicals policy during the Austrian Presidencies in 1998, 2006 and 2018, and as former President of EU Council working group on international environmental policy (chemicals) and Registration, Evaluation, Authorisation and Restriction of Chemicals (REACH). During Austria's third EU- Presidency 2018 he designed and implemented a special policy program to integrate resource efficiency and effectiveness evaluation as political goals into Chemicals Policy.

Dr. Jakl has led the Austrian delegation to the negotiating bodies for multilateral environmental agreements such as Montreal Protocol, Vienna Convention for the Protection of the Ozone Layer, Stockholm Convention, the Rotterdam Convention, SAICM etc. He has been responsible for sector specific policies for organic solvents, nanomaterials, pesticides, detergents, endocrine disrupters etc.

Dr. Jakl is a prominent public speaker who addresses global issues pertaining to sustainable development, circular economy and environmental management. He is a prolific writer credited with over 100 publications in high quality newspapers, journals and books on various societal and environmental — science related issues. In August 2021 Thomas published his book "How bio is the Bobo?" (German: "Wie bio ist der Bobo") compiling 38 of his most influential and most commented essays. 
ISBN Paperback: 978-3-99129-237-1
ISBN Hardcover: 978-3-99129-235-7
ISBN E-Book: 978-3-99129-236-4

Dr. Jakl is one of the most influential thinkers on the subject of sustainable  chemical management, and the foremost propounder of Chemical Leasing. He is the co-author of "Chemical Leasing" and "Chemical Leasing goes Global." He has pioneering contributions to the fields of scientific and technical risk assessment of substances and products, best practice diffusion for the production and application of chemical products as well as "Green Chemistry" and "Circular Economy".

Membership of professional bodies
	HBM4EU (Human Biomonitoring for Europe) - EU Horizon 2020 funded lighthouse initiative; Chair of the Governing Board, HBM4EU — Ambassador 2017-2022.
       European Chemicals Agency (ECHA) – former Member of Management Board; elected as Chair of the Management Board since 2008 until 30092012.
   PARC (Partnership on Risk Assessment of Chemicals, Horizon Europe); elected chair of the Governing Board 11052022 
	Federal Environment Agency – Deputy Head of Supervisory Board
	Federal Agency for Site Remediation – Head of Supervisory Board
       International Sustainable Chemistry Collaborative Centre (ISC3) - Member of Advisory Council
       Global Green Chemistry Initiative (GGCI)  - Member of Advisory Board
	Austrian Federal Ministry for Environment   (Deputy Director General)

Awards and honours
	Grand Decoration of Honour for Services to the Republic of Austria
       Grand Decoration of Honour in Silver for Services to the Republic of Austria
       Winner of most important Austrian journalism "Environment Award;"
	Winner of the EU co-funded "Genius" Award for Innovation.
       Austrian Supply Innovation Award 2008 for "Chemical Leasing"
	Invited speaker at the European Forum Alpbach  (1992).

External links
       Dr. Jakl's keynote at the Conference for a "Non Toxic Future" hosted by the Danish Environment ministry, 24 November 2016
       Dr. Jakl addresses high level audience at ECHA's 10th anniversary
        Thomas' Opening of the Green Chemistry Conference of the Austrian EU-Presidency 2018
       Thomas as "Chemical Leasing" testimonial at the 4th Global Chemical Leasing Award ceremony
       Thomas moderating the 5th Chemical Leasing Award ceremony 2018
       Dr. Jakl's speech on perspectives for the chemicals industry, World Environment Day 2011, UNOV
       Presentation for World Environment Day 2011
       Link to the European initiative on Human Biomonitoring "HBM4EU":
       
       Thomas specifies the future European science/policy interface in the front-page article in the HBM4EU newsletter 09/2020 : 
        Dr. Jakl on Persistent Organic Pollutants "Stop the POPs"
       Thomas' presentation at the "REACH and beyond" conference, 20 October 2015, Brussels
       Entropy, Epigenetics, Efficiency 3 "E’s"–the Pillars for a Chemicals Policy Vision beyond 2020; ISC3 Newsletter December 2016
 Interview in ECHA's newsletter, September 2015
       European Science and Innovation Days 2019 - panel debate on Environment ant Health; Thomas' statement starts around minute 16
      Keynote German EU - Presidency Conference HBMC2020 Oct 2020
      Research must move closer to politics! HBM4EU Newsletter 2020
      Opening of the Launch Event for Austria's Circular Economy Strategy
      Thomas joining a TV - discussion on the future of chemistry
       Introducing "Green Chemistry"

    

Thomas is on Facebook:

Austrian environmentalists
Living people
Year of birth missing (living people)